"U Drive Me Crazy" is the first single taken from American boy band NSYNC's seasonal studio album, The Winter Album, as well as on the UK version of their self-titled debut album. The song was a major hit in Spain, reaching number four on the AFYVE chart and spending five weeks in the top fifteen.

Music video

Background
The video for "U Drive Me Crazy" was released in 1998 outside of the US, and was directed by Lionel C. Martin. Lou Pearlman is briefly seen in the video.

Synopsis
The video begins with a montage resembling a TV sitcom opening. The members of NSYNC are introduced in the apartment in a frame freeze; Justin is making a sandwich, Lance is making papier-mâché, JC is playing the guitar, Joey is reading "Girlymag" and Chris is trying to get his dog to pull him on his wagon. Lance sees an advertisement which states that a famous producer by the name of Johnny Correcto (played by their manager Johnny Wright) is looking for a new star.

They drive to the audition where they get rejected at the reception desk. Feeling dejected, the group notices a girl holding a bouquet of flowers and decide on a plan. They return to the hotel dressed as a glam metal band and while Justin distracts the receptionist with the flowers, the rest sneak in and play for Johnny before getting kicked out, dressing as Slash and Axl Rose from Guns N' Roses, as well as members from Twisted Sister.
 	
The NSYNC members are able to figure out where Johnny is and attempt to play for him but are constantly rejected by the producer and the audience present. They arrive to a dinner for international dignitaries and pose as The Jackson 5, show up at a pool party dressed as the Spice Girls, and appear as rappers. The group eventually dance as themselves to the delight of the audience, as Johnny offers them a contract.

Reception
Rolling Stone noted that the video's message was about "being yourself", despite commenting on the absurdities of "dressing up in drag to distract a record executive's secretary or infiltrating a dinner party for world leaders dressed as, more or less, the Jackson 5."

Track listings
 "U Drive Me Crazy" (Radio Edit) – 3:34  	
 "U Drive Me Crazy" (Extended Version) – 4:40 	
 "U Drive Me Crazy" (2-4 Family 7" Remix) – 3:24 	
 "U Drive Me Crazy" (Trime'n Delgado 12" Remix) – 5:33

Charts

Release history

References

1998 singles
1998 songs
NSYNC songs
RCA Records singles
Songs written by Toni Cottura
Torch songs
Songs written by Bülent Aris